NakedSelf is a 2000 album by the British band The The. It was the band's first album since Hanky Panky (1995) and the first containing original material since Dusk (1993). In terms of sales, it was the band's least successful until that point, peaking at 45 in the UK Album Chart. As of 2020, it is the most recent studio album by The The, except for three soundtracks.

Production
The album, produced by Bruce Lampcov and Matt Johnson, was recorded in New York City. Johnson decided to make the album without the use of samplers, keyboards, or sequencers. Guitarist Eric Schermerhorn, who had joined The The before the recording of Hanky Panky (replacing Johnny Marr), took an active role alongside Johnson, with co-writing credits on six out of twelve tracks. The band released NakedSelf through Nothing Records after it was deemed by Sony as lacking in commercial value.

Critical reception
The album received mainly positive reviews from critics, with an average Metacritic rating of 75/100. Pitchfork wrote that the album "finds Matt Johnson in his element, tackling issues of alienation, global corruption, and urban squalor and decay with potent, more succinct lyrics and some of his most affecting melodies in ages." The Austin Chronicle called the album "a solid return, appropriately dark and seedy when lyrics turn to interpersonal relationships (or the impossibility thereof), as they usually do." The Chicago Tribune wrote: "A modern-day blues album, NakedSelf is steeped in distortion and cynical takes on love and loneliness." The New Zealand Herald wrote that "the musical approach here is certainly effective in its taut, barbed and occasionally bluesy guitar attack with occasional acoustic urges."

Track listing 
 "Boiling Point" (Matt Johnson, Eric Schermerhorn) - 5:48
 "Shrunken Man" (Matt Johnson) - 4:55
 "The Whisperers" (Matt Johnson, Eric Schermerhorn) - 3:20
 "Soul Catcher" (Matt Johnson) - 3:15
 "Global Eyes" (Matt Johnson) - 4:10
 "December Sunlight" (Matt Johnson, Eric Schermerhorn) - 3:18
 "Swine Fever" (Matt Johnson) - 3:39
 "Diesel Breeze" (Matt Johnson, Eric Schermerhorn) - 2:52
 "Weather Belle" (Matt Johnson) - 3:47
 "Voidy Numbness" (Matt Johnson, Eric Schermerhorn) - 4:04
 "Phantom Walls" (Matt Johnson) - 4:17
 "Salt Water" (Matt Johnson, Eric Schermerhorn) - 2:13

References

2000 albums
The The albums
Nothing Records albums